Santiago Massini (20 August 1914 – 22 October 2003) was an Argentine fencer. He competed at the 1952 and 1956 Summer Olympics.

References

External links
 

1914 births
2003 deaths
Argentine male fencers
Argentine épée fencers
Argentine foil fencers
Olympic fencers of Argentina
Fencers at the 1952 Summer Olympics
Fencers at the 1956 Summer Olympics
Pan American Games medalists in fencing
Pan American Games gold medalists for Argentina
Pan American Games silver medalists for Argentina
Fencers at the 1951 Pan American Games
Fencers at the 1955 Pan American Games
20th-century Argentine people